Aylward is a name that may refer to:
Surname
Bob Aylward (1911–1974), Irish politician
Bobby Aylward (born 1955), Irish politician
Bruce Aylward, Canadian physician and Assistant Director General of the WHO
Dick Aylward (1925–1983), American baseball player
Gladys Aylward (1902–1970), English missionary
Gordon Aylward, Australian chemist
James Ambrose Dominic Aylward (1813–1872), English theologian and poet
James Aylward (cricketer) (1741–1827), English cricketer
James P. Aylward (1885–1982), American lawyer and politician
John Aylward (born 1946), American actor
Liam Aylward (born 1952), Irish politician
Samkin Aylward, fictional character from Arthur Conan Doyle's novel The White Company
Samkin Aylward, a fictional character from S. M. Stirling's Emberverse series novels named after the Doyle character
Theodore Aylward (1730–1801), English organist
Given name
Aylward M. Blackman (1883–1956), British Egyptologist